"Ging Gang Gooli(-e)" or "Ging Gang Goo" (below “Ging Gang”) is a gibberish song, widely spread around the world. It is popular among Scouts and Girl Guides.

Origin
In 1905 the song, with Scandinavian spelling of the gibberish, was presented at a New Year’s cabaret in Gothenburg, Sweden. The lyrics and the melody were presumably derived from student singing in Central Europe.  Robert Baden-Powell is often quoted as the originator of the song, but there is no evidence that he was involved in its creation nor its introduction. After early adoption by the Scandinavian Scout organisations, the song became eventually (starting in the 1940s and 1950s) a global hit among Scouts. The Ging Gang melody is today the same as in 1905, whereas the spelling of the lyrics has changed in translations.

The 1905 lyrics:

Hinkan, kolikolikolikolifejsan / Kinkan koh, kinkan koh
Hinkan, kolikolikolikolifejsan / Kinkan koh, kinkan koh
Ava, illa shava / O illa shava / Kolifejs!
Ava, illa shava / O illa shava / Kolifejs!
Tjolafalla, tjolafalla!

Phoneticized to English (earliest documented version 1952; many other variations in spelling and phonemes exist):

Ging gang, goolie goolie goolie goolie watcha / Ging gang goo, Ging gang goo
Ging gang, goolie goolie goolie goolie watcha / Ging gang goo, Ging gang goo
Heyla, heyla sheyla / Heyla sheyla / Heyla, ho!
Heyla, heyla sheyla / Heyla sheyla / Heyla, ho!
Shallawalla, shallawalla! / Shallawalla, shallawalla!
Oompah-oompah! / Oompah-oompah!

Versions

The century long popularity of Ging Gang is reflected by its inclusion (with various spellings and settings) in song books and records and other media all over the world - and today by the large number of youtube videos from different sources and with different purposes: scouts, orchestras, fitness/dance classes, night club, etc.

In 1926, the probably earliest commercial record with a version of Ging Gang, Kinkan, was recorded in New York by the Columbia Phonograph Company: an arrangement for male choir, “Kinkan-Halvan”, with "Gleeklubben” in Brooklyn and the musical group "Lyran". The second part, “Halvan”, is a drinking song from the 1860-ies..

In 1969, a version was recorded by British comedic group The Scaffold.  Released as a single, "Gin Gan Goolie" reached number 38 on the UK Singles Chart.

In 1978, British parody satire band The Rutles recorded a version of the song. The song was only released in the UK, and never officially released as part of an album.

In 1991 Dorothy Unterschutz, a Canadian Scout Leader from Edmonton, wrote a dramatization of the song in the form of a tale named "The Great Grey Ghost Elephant". It was published in Scouts Canada's The Leader magazine in the 1991 June–July Issue (p. 7). The tale has also become a hit.

References

External links

1905 establishments in Sweden
1905 songs
1900s in Gothenburg
Scouting
Institutional songs
Swedish songs
Gibberish language